The 1987 Australian Sports Car Championship was a CAMS sanctioned Australian national motor racing title open to Group A Sports Cars, Group D GT cars, FISA Group C1 cars and FISA Group C2 cars.

The title, which was the 19th Australian Sports Car Championship, was won by Andy Roberts driving his self-designed Robert SR3 powered by a 1.6 litre Ford BDA Formula Mondial engine which, while not winning a round, scored consistent Up to 1.6 litres class placings (which paid more points) to win the title. Roberts was also the only driver in the top 5 championship placings to finish all 3 rounds. Defending champion John Bowe was expected to dominate the series in Bernie van Elsen's Veskanda C1 Chevrolet, and did easily win rounds 2 and 3 (including setting the outright lap record in Round 2 at Amaroo Park), but an engine problem in the opening round at a very wet Calder Park Raceway saw him only finish 2nd. Finishing 3rd in the championship was Terry Hook in his Chevrolet powered ex-Rupert Keegan Lola T610 with two second-place finishes at Calder and Sandown.

Calendar
The championship was contested over a three-round series with one race per round. 

Additional rounds scheduled at Lakeside (April 5), Adelaide International Raceway (3 May) and Winton (30 August ) were cancelled.

Classes
Cars competed in three engine capacity classes.
 Up to 1.6 litres
 1.6 to 3 litres
 Over 3 litres

Points system
Championship points were awarded to the top twenty outright placegetters in each round based on the following three tier structure.

Results

Note: The above table lists only the first five positions in the championship.

References

Australian Sports Car Championship
Sports Car Championship